Carl Johannes Andreas Adam Dørnberger (23 September 1864 - 8 July 1940) was a Norwegian painter. He principally performed naturalistic and figurative images.

Life and career
Carl Johannes Andreas Adam Dørnberger was born at Nøtterøy in Vestfold, Norway. He was the son of  Johann Christopher Dörnberger from Nuremberg and Augusta Charlotte Wilhelmine Luise Mönch from Stralsund. His born  German father worked as master brewer in Tønsberg. When he was eight years old the family traveled back to Germany, where he lived until became a student of David Arnesen (1818-1895) and Johan Jacob Bennetter (1822-1904) in Christiania (now Oslo) at the age of seventeen. In 1883 he traveled to Paris where he studied under several artists including William-Adolphe Bouguereau of Académie Julian.

He debuted at the Høstutstillingen in 1887, and had his first solo exhibition in 1900. That same year he married Lina Gurine Berg Isachen, and they had a daughter, Gro Franciska Dørnberger (born 1904). Dørnberger had many famous artists in his circle, including Edvard Munch and Akseli Gallen-Kallela, who both painted portraits of him.

Around 1896 he moved to the Norwegian port town of Son in Akershus where he lived for the remainder of his life in his home  known as "Dørnbergerhuset". Many of Dørnberger's works are motifs from Son, including the historic buildings in the town center and the steamer jetty lying below his house. He remained largely naturalist while painting landscapes, portraits, figurative studies and  nautical scenes.

He was, for many, at least as well known for his eccentric lifestyle as for his art. In 1895 he acquired a wooden leg after breaking  his leg so that it had to be amputated. He carried two pistols which he called "Kitty" and "Kitty's brother". In 1921 he shot an office manager in Hurum  and wound him. He was later acquitted by the court of law.

References

Other sources
Bjørn Linnestad (1989) Carl Johannes Andreas Adam Dørnberger: Maler og musketér (Vestby kunstforening )

External links
 Biographical notes  @ Lokal Magasinet
 Dørnberger's days as a student in Paris  @ Lokal Magasinet

1864 births
1940 deaths
People from Vestfold
19th-century Norwegian painters
20th-century Norwegian painters
Norwegian male painters
Norwegian people of German descent
19th-century Norwegian male artists
20th-century Norwegian male artists